Be Still and Know... Hymns & Faith is a compilation album by Amy Grant. It is mostly made up of tracks from two of her previous albums, Legacy... Hymns and Faith and Rock of Ages... Hymns and Faith. It also features two new songs. Sparrow Records released the album on April 14, 2015. Grant worked with Marshall Altman and Vince Gill in the production of this album.

Critical reception

Giving the album four stars for CCM Magazine, Andy Argyrakis writes, "Amy Grant is still attracted to those timeless treasures." Tony Cummings, rating the album seven out of ten at Cross Rhythms, says, "Amy's voice is, of course, faultless and remains one of the most distinctive sounds in modern pop music while the arrangements, veering towards a pop country sound and only occasionally teetering into string-filled MOR, are often imaginative." Awarding the album four stars from New Release Tuesday, Kevin Davis states, "Be Still and Know -- Hymns & Faith is a fresh take on the timeless hymns of the church. Modern arrangements, new choruses and sometimes-complete re-imaginations help these deep and meaningful songs shine." Barry Westman, rating the album four stars at Worship Leader, says, "Be Still and Know contains just the right mix of familiar songs and newer songs of faith, all featuring Amy's familiar, smooth vocals."

Mark D. Geil, writing a four star review for Jesus Freak Hideout, describes, "Be Still and Know showcases some of Amy Grant's finest work while reaffirming her staying power and continued songcraft." Rating the album three and a half stars from Louder Than the Music, Jono Davies says, it is "a real treat." Joshua Andre, awarding the album four stars at 365 Days of Inspiring Media, writes, "Well done Amy for creating an album that reminds us why she is one of the best female singer/songwriters currently". Giving the album nine out of ten stars from The Front Row Report, Reggie Edwards states, "Amy Grant has done what she’s done all along and created an album that will suck you in, get you involved and move you beyond your expectations."

Commercial performance
The album debuted at No. 88 on Top Current Albums, selling 5,000 copies in the first week.  It also debuted No. 7 on Christian Albums on its release, where peaked at No. 6 the following year on that chart.  The album has sold 27,000 copies in the United States as of August 2016.

Track listing

Personnel 

Music credits (Tracks 1 & 2)
 Amy Grant – lead vocals 
 Tony Harrell – Hammond B3 organ
 Richard Bennett – acoustic guitar 
 Vince Gill – acoustic guitar, harmony vocals, arrangements (1)
 Tom Bukovac – electric guitars 
 Paul Franklin – steel guitar
 Michael Rhodes – bass 
 Fred Eltringham – drums, percussion

Music credits (Track 3)
 Amy Grant – lead vocals 
 Tim Lauer – acoustic piano, organ
 Marshall Altman – programming, backing vocals 
 Matt Duke – acoustic guitar, backing vocals 
 Jedd Hughes – electric guitar 
 Rob McNelley – electric guitar 
 Tony Lucido – bass 
 Shannon Forrest – drums 
 Jonathan Yudkin – cello 

Music credits (Track 13)
 Amy Grant – lead and backing vocals, arrangements 
 Brown Bannister – accordion, arrangements 
 Evie McPherson – accordion
 Jerry McPherson – dulcimer, violin ukulele, arrangements
 Gary Chapman – bass
 Mark O'Connor – arrangements

Production 

Credits (Tracks 1 & 2)
 Vince Gill – producer 
 Justin Niebank – engineer, mixing 
 Drew Bollman – assistant engineer 
 Matt Rausch – assistant engineer
 Hank Williams – mastering 

Credits (Track 3)
 Marshall Altman – producer, vocal recording 
 Angela Talley – production assistant 
 Craig Alvin – recording, mixing 
 Chris Wilkinson – assistant engineer 
 Shani Ghandi – tracking assistant 
 Andrew Mendelson – mastering 

Credits (Track 13)
 Brown Bannister – producer 
 Jeff Balding – recording, mixing 
 Steve Bishir – recording assistant 

Additional credits
 Brown Bannister – producer (4-10, 12, 14, 15)
 Vince Gill – producer (4-10, 12, 14, 15)
 Marshall Altman – producer (11)
 Peter York – executive producer 
 Becca Wildsmith – artwork, design 
 Jim Wright – photography

Charts

References

2015 compilation albums
Amy Grant compilation albums
Sparrow Records compilation albums